Bresnica is a village in the Zvečan municipality, in northern Kosovo. It is inhabited by Serbs, located in Serb-majority North Kosovo. According to the 2011 census, it had a population of 145 people. It was mentioned in the 1455 defter (Ottoman tax registry) as Brusnica. There are ruins of an old church and an old graveyard above the hamlet of Krst.

Notes

References

Villages in Zvečan